The Djiboutian Air Force (DAF) ( (FADD)), is the Air Force of Djibouti. It was established as part of the Djibouti Armed Forces after the country obtained its independence on June 27, 1977. Its peacetime tasks are airspace surveillance, identification flights, and providing support to ground forces, as well as assisting civil operations during national emergencies. The first aircraft included three Nord N.2501 Noratlas transport aircraft, as well as a French Aérospatiale Alouette II helicopter. 

The DAF is mandated with protecting Djibouti's airspace, and in assisting ground forces.

History

In 1982, the Djibouti Air Force was augmented by two Eurocopter AS355 Écureuil 2 helicopters and a Cessna 206 followed in 1985 by a Cessna 402C Utiliner. In 1985 the Aérospatiale Alouette III was withdrawn from use and put on display at Ambouli Air Base as Djibouti's airport is called. Two years later, the three Nord Noratlas were also put aside and given back to France later. 

New equipment came in 1991 by means of a Cessna 208 Caravan followed by all the Russian types in the early nineties. They included four Mi 2, six Mi 8 and two Mi 17 helicopters and a single Antonov An-28 light transport aircraft. 

Pilot training, if necessary, is conducted in France and continued on the type of flying at home, although demand for new pilots is low with only approximately 310 men in the Djiboutian Air Force. 

As of 2018, the Air Force had a strength of 360 personnel, and operated a small number of transport aircraft and helicopters.

Aircraft

References
Citations

Works consulted

Air forces by country
Air Force
Military units and formations established in 1977
1977 establishments in Djibouti